Vitaly Vasilyev (born June 5, 1973) is a Kyrgyzstani swimmer, who specialized in sprint freestyle events. He is a two-time Olympian (1996 and 2008), and a former Kyrgyzstan record holder in the 50 and 100 m freestyle.

Vasilyev made his first Kyrgyz team at the 1996 Summer Olympics in Atlanta. There, he failed to reach a top 16 final in the 50 m freestyle, finishing in fifty-second place with a time of 24.54. He also placed eighteenth, as a member of the Kyrgyzstan team, in the 4 × 100 m freestyle (3:30.62), and seventeenth in the 4 × 200 m freestyle (8:00.00).

Twelve years after competing in his last Olympics, Vasilyev qualified for his second Kyrgyzstan team, as a 35-year-old, at the 2008 Summer Olympics in Beijing. He cleared a FINA B-standard entry time of 23.11 seconds from the Kazakhstan Open Swimming Championships in Almaty. He challenged seven other swimmers on the seventh heat, including two-time Olympians Jevon Atkinson of Jamaica and Joshua Laban of the Virgin Islands. For the second time, Vasilyev rounded out the field to last place by less than 0.26 of a second behind Laban, lowering his Olympic time to 24.02 seconds. Vasilyev failed to advance into the semifinals, as he placed fifty-fifth out of 92 swimmers in the preliminary heats.

References

External links
 
NBC 2008 Olympics profile

1973 births
Living people
Sportspeople from Bishkek
Kyrgyzstani people of Russian descent
Soviet male freestyle swimmers
Kyrgyzstani male freestyle swimmers
Olympic swimmers of Kyrgyzstan
Swimmers at the 1996 Summer Olympics
Swimmers at the 2008 Summer Olympics